Just Like You is the third studio album by the Canadian country music artist Crystal Shawanda. It was released in Canada on April 24, 2012, via Shawanda's own New Sun Records and distributed by Fontana North. The album received three and a half stars out of five from Jeff DeDekker of the Leader-Post.

"Just Like You" was awarded 'Best Aboriginal Album of the Year' at the 2013 Juno Awards.

Track listing

References

2012 albums
Crystal Shawanda albums
Juno Award for Indigenous Music Album of the Year albums